Admiral Smith may refer to:

Australia
Geoffrey Smith (admiral) (born 1950), Royal Australian Navy rear admiral
Victor Smith (1913–1998), Royal Australian Navy admiral

United Kingdom
Aubrey Smith (Royal Navy officer) (1872–1957), British Royal Navy admiral
Conolly Abel Smith (1899–1985), British Royal Navy vice admiral
Isaac Smith (Royal Navy officer) (1752–1831), British Royal Navy rear admiral
Jeremiah Smith (Royal Navy officer) (died 1675), British Royal Navy admiral
Sidney Smith (Royal Navy officer) (1764–1840), British Royal Navy admiral
Thomas Smith (Royal Navy officer) (1707–1762), British Royal Navy admiral
William Smith (Royal Navy officer) (died 1756), British Royal Navy rear admiral

United States
Edward H. Smith (sailor) (1889–1961), U.S. Coast Guard admiral
F. Neale Smith (1930–2020), U.S. Navy rear admiral
Harold Page Smith (1904–1993), U.S. Navy four-star admiral
James Thomas Smith (1908–1980), U.S. Navy rear admiral
Joseph Smith (admiral) (1790–1877), U.S. Navy rear admiral
Leighton W. Smith Jr. (born 1939), U.S. Navy admiral
Levering Smith (1910–1993), U.S. Navy vice admiral
Raymond C. Smith (born 1943), U.S. Navy rear admiral
Shepard M. Smith (fl. 1990s–2020s), U.S. Navy rear admiral
Steven G. Smith (born 1946), U.S. Navy rear admiral
Willard J. Smith (1910–2000), U.S. Coast Guard admiral
William D. Smith (1933–2020), U.S. Navy admiral
William W. Smith (admiral) (1888–1966), U.S. Navy vice admiral

See also
William Henry Smyth (1788–1865), British Royal Navy admiral
Nathaniel Bowden-Smith (1838–1921), British Royal Navy admiral
General Smith (disambiguation)